The Mauritania Railway is the national railway of Mauritania. Construction of the line began in 1960, with it opening in 1963. It consists of a single,  railway line linking the iron mining centre of Zouérat with the port of Nouadhibou, via Fderik and Choum. The state agency Société nationale industrielle et minière (SNIM) controls the railway line.

Since the closure of the Choum Tunnel, a  section of the railway cuts through the Polisario Front-controlled part of the Western Sahara.

History

The line was a success and provided a major portion of Mauritania's GDP; as a result the line was nationalised in 1974. Following Mauritania's annexation of southern Western Sahara in 1976, the line came under constant attack by Polisario militia, effectively putting the line out of use and thereby crippling Mauritania's economy. This played a major role in prompting the army to overthrow Mauritanian president Moktar Ould Daddah in 1978, followed by a withdrawal from Western Sahara the following year. With the line now secure, repairs were conducted and trains starting using it once again in the early 1980s. This railway is unusual for its usage of the Soviet type coupler SA-3, which is quite rare in non ex-Soviet countries.

Traffic

They consist of 3 or 4 diesel-electric EMD locomotives, 200 to 210 cars each carrying up to 84 tons of iron ore, and 2-3 service cars.

Passengers are also occasionally transported by train; these services are managed by an SNIM subsidiary, the société d'Assainissement, de Travaux, de Transport et de Maintenance (abb. ATTM). Passenger cars are sometimes attached to freight trains, but more often passengers simply ride atop the ore hopper cars freely. Passengers include locals, merchants, and occasionally some adventure tourists. Conditions for these passengers are incredibly harsh with daytime temperatures exceeding 40 °C and death from falls being common.

In January 2019, the railway resumed tourism after a ten-year hiatus; part of the track ran through a forbidden tourist area. One of the stops on the tourist route is an iron mine. The tourist route is typically operated by a locomotive carrying two passenger carriages.

Locomotives 
In October 2010, SNIM ordered six EMD SD-70ACS locomotives, which featured a pulse filtration system, movable sand plows, EM2000 control system and FIRE display system together with similar modifications to allow for operations in high temperatures.

Prior to this the railway had operated US-built EMD SDL40-2s, also with  special modifications to deal with operating in dusty and high temperature environments, which themselves were the replacement for twenty-one MIFERNA Class CC locomotives which had been custom-made in France to operate in the same rough conditions.

Glencore 

In 2014, the mining company Glencore paid $1 billion for 18 years of access to SNIM's rail and port infrastructure, which would be connected to branch lines to new iron mines at Askaf and Guelb El Aouj. The deal would have saved the company the cost of constructing their own tracks and facilities. However, Glencore backed out of the project just one year later after the price of iron ore tumbled nearly 40%.

See also

 Economy of Mauritania
 History of rail transport in Mauritania
 Transport in Mauritania
 Railway stations in Mauritania
 Enclave and exclave - crossborder shortcut to avoid tunnel

References

Notes

Further reading

External links

SNIM train site
Train images at Adventures in Mauritania
Map of railway route
This Sahara Railway Is One of the Most Extreme in the World (National Geographics Short Film Showcase)
Hot, free and dangerous: A train ride in Mauritania (Washington Post)
The iron trains of Mauritania (Al Jazeera)
Train to (almost) nowhere in Mauritania (New York Times)
Atop a long train in Africa, heading for change (Reuters)
The Mauritania Railway: Backbone of the Sahara, a short documentary film.

Railway lines in Mauritania
Railway companies of Mauritania
Transport in Western Sahara